Max Beer (15 September 1912 – 19 December 1995) was a Swiss long-distance runner. He competed in the marathon at the 1936 Summer Olympics.

References

External links
 

1912 births
1995 deaths
Athletes (track and field) at the 1936 Summer Olympics
Swiss male long-distance runners
Swiss male marathon runners
Olympic athletes of Switzerland